Killbuck is a village in Holmes County, Ohio, United States, along Killbuck Creek. The population was 817 at the 2010 census.

Local tradition states the name is derived from an incident when a deer was killed near the town site. According to a later source, the village was named for Killbuck, a Delaware Indian chief.

Geography
Killbuck is located at  (40.498081, -81.983436).

Demographics

2010 census
As of the census of 2010, there were 817 people, 334 households, and 215 families living in the village. The racial makeup of the village was 99.1% White, 0.1% Asian, 0.1% from other races, and 0.6% from two or more races. Hispanic or Latino of any race were 0.5% of the population.

There were 334 households, of which 33.8% had children under the age of 18 living with them, 42.5% were married couples living together, 17.1% had a female householder with no husband present, 4.8% had a male householder with no wife present, and 35.6% were non-families. 31.1% of all households were made up of individuals, and 15% had someone living alone who was 65 years of age or older. The average household size was 2.45 and the average family size was 3.06.

The median age in the village was 38 years. 27.5% of residents were under the age of 18; 6.2% were between the ages of 18 and 24; 25.1% were from 25 to 44; 26.3% were from 45 to 64; and 14.9% were 65 years of age or older. The gender makeup of the village was 44.7% male and 55.3% female.

2000 census
As of the census of 2000, there were 839 people, 358 households, and 235 families living in the village. The population density was 2,961.5 people per square mile (1,156.9/km2). There were 379 housing units at an average density of 1,337.8 per square mile (522.6/km2). The racial makeup of the village was 99.52% White, 0.36% Native American, 0.12% from other races. Hispanic or Latino of any race were 0.60% of the population.

There were 358 households, out of which 28.8% had children under the age of 18 living with them, 48.3% were married couples living together, 13.1% had a female householder with no husband present, and 34.1% were non-families. 28.8% of all households were made up of individuals, and 14.2% had someone living alone who was 65 years of age or older. The average household size was 2.34 and the average family size was 2.86.

In the village, the population was spread out, with 25.4% under the age of 18, 8.7% from 18 to 24, 27.2% from 25 to 44, 21.6% from 45 to 64, and 17.2% who were 65 years of age or older. The median age was 37 years. For every 100 females there were 90.7 males. For every 100 females age 18 and over, there were 86.3 males.

The median income for a household in the village was $30,250, and the median income for a family was $33,594. Males had a median income of $24,420 versus $20,781 for females. The per capita income for the village was $15,510. About 10.6% of families and 12.2% of the population were below the poverty line, including 17.5% of those under age 18 and 4.6% of those age 65 or over.

References

Villages in Holmes County, Ohio
Villages in Ohio